Linati is an Italian surname. Notable people with this surname include:

 Claudio Linati (1790–1832), Italian painter and lithographer
 Giovanni Linati (1562–1627), Italian bishop

See also
 Linati schema for Ulysses

Italian-language surnames